Bennet Hundt (born 20 August 1998) is a German professional basketball player for USC Heidelberg of the Basketball Bundesliga. He has represented Germany in several youth international tournaments.

Early career
Hundt grew up in Berlin. He began his youth career at TuS Lichterfelde, competing in the Jugend Basketball Bundesliga, the German under-16 league. In the 2014–15 season, he played for Dalton High School in Dalton, Georgia, where he was an exchange student. He lived with school board member Rick Fromm as his host family. After one year, Hundt joined Alba Berlin and split playing time between the main club in the Basketball Bundesliga (BBL) and the EuroCup, and its affiliated ProB team, SSV Lokomotive Bernau.

Professional career
On 25 June 2019, Hundt signed a one-year contract with BG Göttingen of the BBL. On 6 June 2020, he scored a career-high 30 points, shooting 5-of-9 from three-point range, in an 89–78 win over Crailsheim Merlins in the preliminary round of the 2020 BBL Final Tournament. 

On 10 July 2020, Hundt signed a one-year contract with Brose Bamberg of the BBL.

On June 2, 2021, he has signed with EWE Baskets Oldenburg of the Basketball Bundesliga.

On January 9, 2023, he transferred to the  MLP Academics Heidelberg of the Basketball Bundesliga.

National team career
Hundt represented Germany in several youth international tournaments. In 2014, he averaged 3.2 points and 1.7 assists per game at the U16 FIBA European Championships. He won a bronze medal at the 2018 FIBA U20 European Championship in Chemnitz. In February 2020, Hundt made his senior national team debut at the EuroBasket qualification stage.

Personal life
Hundt's father Oliver and mother played basketball at the professional level in Germany. His older brother, Jannes, also plays the sport professionally.

References

External links
Bennet Hundt International Stats at Basketball-Reference.com

1998 births
Living people
Basketball players from Berlin
Alba Berlin players
BG Göttingen players
EWE Baskets Oldenburg players
German expatriate basketball people in the United States
German men's basketball players
Point guards
Riesen Ludwigsburg players